Carl Preston Oglesby (July 30, 1935 – September 13, 2011) was an American writer, academic, and political activist. He was the President of the leftist student organization Students for a Democratic Society (SDS) from 1965 to 1966.

Early life
His father was from South Carolina, and his mother was from Alabama. They met in Akron, Ohio, where the elder Oglesby worked in the rubber mills.

Carl Oglesby graduated from Revere High School in suburban Akron, winning a prize in his final year for a speech in favor of America's Cold War stance. He then enrolled at Kent State University for three years before dropping out to attempt to make his way as an actor and playwright in Greenwich Village, a traditionally Bohemian neighborhood in New York City. While at Kent State, he married Beth Rimanoczy, a graduate student in the English department; they ultimately had three children (Aron, Caleb and Shay). After a year in New York, he returned to Akron, where he became a copywriter for Goodyear and continued working on his creative endeavors, including three plays influenced by Britain's "angry young men" literary movement (exemplified by "a well-received work on the Hatfield-McCoy feud") and an unfinished novel.

In 1958, Oglesby and his family moved to Ann Arbor, Michigan, where he took a technical writing position with the Bendix Corporation, a defense contractor. He ascended to the directorship of the company's technical writing division before completing his undergraduate degree as a part-time student at the University of Michigan (where he cultivated a circle of friends that included Donald Hall and Frithjof Bergmann) in 1962.

Contact with SDS
Oglesby first came into contact with members of SDS in Ann Arbor in 1964. He wrote a critical article on American foreign policy in the Far East in the University of Michigan's campus magazine. SDSers read it, and went to meet Carl at his family home to see if he might become a supporter of the SDS. As Oglebsy put it, "We talked. I got to thinking about things. As a writer, I needed a mode of action [...] I saw that people were already moving, so I joined up." He left Bendix in 1965 and became a full-time Research, Information, Publications (RIP) worker for SDS. 

He co-authored with Richard Shaull the book, Containment and Change which argued for an alliance between the New Left and the libertarian, non-interventionist Old Right in opposing an imperialist U.S. foreign policy.

He became so impressed by the spirit and intellectual strength of the SDS that he became deeply involved in the organization. Despite the notable age gap between Oglesby and the traditionally-aged undergraduates who comprised most of the organization's  membership, he became its president within a year. His first project was to be a "grass-roots theatre", but that project was soon superseded by the opposition to escalating American activity in Vietnam; he helped organize a teach-in in Michigan, and to build for the large SDS peace march in Washington on April 17, 1965. The National Council meeting after was Oglesby's first national SDS meeting. On November 27, 1965, Oglesby gave a speech, "Let Us Shape the Future," before tens of thousands of anti-war demonstrators in Washington. He compared the Vietnam revolution to the American revolution. He condemned corporate liberalism and accused corporate anti-Communists of self-righteously denouncing Communist tyranny, while ignoring the "right-wing tyrannies that our businessmen traffic with and our nation profits from every day." The speech became one of the most important documents to come out of the anti-war movement. According to Kirkpatrick Sale: "It was a devastating performance: skilled, moderate, learned, and compassionate, but uncompromising, angry, radical, and above all persuasive. It drew the only standing ovation of the afternoon... for years afterward it would continue to be one of the most popular items of SDS literature."

Oglesby's political outlook was more eclectic than that of many in SDS. He was heavily influenced by libertarian economist Murray Rothbard, and dismissed socialism as "a way to bury social problems under a federal bureaucracy." He once unsuccessfully proposed cooperation between SDS and the conservative group Young Americans for Freedom on some projects, and argued that "in a strong sense, the Old Right and the New Left are morally and politically coordinate":

Steve Mariotti, a teenage SDS colleague of Oglesby's in 1965, credits Oglesby with describing an early form of what became known as the two-axis Nolan Chart during a delivery of his "Let Us Shape the Future" speech in order to distinguish between authoritarian conservatives and liberty-loving right-wingers.

In 1968, he signed the "Writers and Editors War Tax Protest" pledge, vowing to refuse tax payments in protest against the Vietnam War. Also in 1968, he was asked by Black Panther leader Eldridge Cleaver to serve as his running mate on the Peace and Freedom Party ticket in that year's presidential election (he declined the offer).

Later life

Oglesby was forced out of SDS in 1969, after more left-wing members accused him of "being 'trapped in our early, bourgeois stage' and for not progressing into 'a Marxist–Leninist perspective.'" After the collapse of SDS in the summer of 1969, Oglesby became a writer, a musician and an academic. His self-titled album was released by Vanguard Records and later reviewed by Village Voice critic Robert Christgau, who wrote in Christgau's Record Guide: Rock Albums of the Seventies (1981): "In which the first president of SDS takes after Leonard Cohen, offering a clue as to why the framers of the Port Huron Statement didn't change the world in quite the way they envisioned. Overwritten, undermusicked, not much fun, not much enlightenment—in short, the work of someone who needs a weatherman (small 'w' please) to know which way the wind blows."

In 1970 he was a featured speaker at the "Left/Right Festival of Liberation" organized by the California Libertarian Alliance. This type of bridge building was not unlike Oglesby; three years earlier, he had written that, "...in a strong sense, the Old Right and the New Left are morally and politically coordinate."

Oglesby moved to Cambridge, Massachusetts, where he founded the Assassination Information Bureau, an organization that has been credited with bringing about the United States House Select Committee on Assassinations. He wrote several books on the assassination of John F. Kennedy and the various competing theories that attempt to explain it. According to Oglesby, Kennedy was killed by "a rightist conspiracy formed out of anti-Castro Cuban exiles, the Syndicate, and a Cowboy oligarchy, supported by renegade CIA and FBI agents." He recorded two albums, roughly in the folk-rock genre, one titled "Going To Damascus."

He taught politics at the Massachusetts Institute of Technology and Dartmouth College. He attended the April 2006 North-Eastern Regional Conference of the "new SDS" and where he gave a speech in which he said that activism is about "teaching yourself how to do what you don't know how to do."

Oglesby died of lung cancer at his home in Montclair, New Jersey on September 13, 2011, aged 76.

In popular culture
Oglesby was portrayed by Michael A. Dean in The Trial of the Chicago 7.

He appeared on The Ron Reagan Show on November 19, 1991, with David Lifton, Robert J. Groden, and Robert Sam Anson.

Works

Books
 Containment and Change: Two Dissenting Views of American Foreign Policy, with Richard Shaull. Introduction by Leon Howell. New York: Macmillan (1967). . Contains Oglesby's award-winning essay, "Vietnam Crucible: An Essay in the Meanings of the Cold War," pp. 3–176.
 The New Left Reader. New York: Grove Press (1969). . .
 The Yankee and Cowboy War: Conspiracies from Dallas to Watergate. Kansas City: Sheed Andrews and McMeel (1976).
 Full text (hardcover). .
 Full text (softcover). .
 Bob Vila's Guide to Buying Your Dream House, with Bob Vila. Research by Nena Groskind. Boston: Little, Brown (1990). . .
 Who Killed JFK? Berkeley, Calif: Odonian Press (1991). . .
 The JFK Assassination: The Facts and Theories. Signet (1992). .
 Ravens in the Storm: A Personal History of the 1960s Antiwar Movement. New York: Scribner (2008). .

Selected articles
 "The Secret Treaty of Fort Hunt." CovertAction Information Bulletin (Fall 1990).

Filmography

Television documentaries
 Beyond JFK: The Question of Conspiracy (1992). Directed by Barbara Kopple & Danny Schechter.
 Articulate '60s Activist Looks Back To See How He Failed Making Sense of the Sixties] (January 21–23, 1991). PBS. Read excerpts.
 Rebels With a Cause (2000). Written and directed by Helen Garvey.

Interviews

Radio
 Interviewed by Bob Fass (January 31, 1975). WBAI Radio (New York). .

Audio
 Interviewed by Bret Eynon (1981). New York Times oral history program. Contemporary History Project oral history collection, no. 35.
 "Student Movements of the 1960s: The Reminiscences of Carl Oglesby." (December 12, 1984). Interviewed by Bret Eynon. Columbia University Oral History Collection (Cambridge, Massachusetts). . Full transcript / audio.
 "Former SDS Leader Insists That LaRouche 'Has Never Been a Marxist.'" Interviewed by Herbert Quinde. Executive Intelligence Review, vol. 13, no. 20 (May 16, 1986), pp. 32–33. Full issue.

Print
 Rosenblatt, Rand K. "Carl Oglesby (Silhouette)." Harvard Crimson (Feb. 15, 1966).
 Kauffman, Bill. "Writers on the Storm." Reason (Apr. 2008). Full issue.
 "Former New Left leader Carl Oglesby on the '60s, his old friend Hillary Rodham Clinton, and the dream of a left-libertarian alliance."

Discography 
 Carl Oglesby [LP] (1967)
 Going to Damascus [LP] (1971)

Collected works
 Clandestine America: Selected Writings on Conspiracies from the Nazi Surrender to Dallas, Watergate, and Beyond. Cambridge, Mass.: Protean Press (2020). .

References

Further reading
 Sale, Kirkpatrick (1974). SDS: Ten Years Towards a Revolution. New York: Vintage Books. . See esp. 194–199.
 Rosenblatt, Rand K. (Feb. 15, 1966). "Carl Oglesby (Silhouette)." Harvard Crimson.
 Russell, Dick (Nov. 1993). "From Dallas to Eternity." Boston Magazine. pp. 62–65, 82, 85–88.
 Gardner, Fred (2016). "The Working Class Stranger – Carl Oglesby." O'Shaughnessy's'.

External links

 Carl Oglesby at Discogs
 Carl Oglesby at IMDb
 Carl Oglesby at Spartacus Educational
 Carl Oglesby collection at the Harold Weisberg Archive via Internet Archive
 Archive of SDS documents, including two speeches by Carl Oglesby.
 Carl Oglesby Papers, 1942–2005  at University of Massachusetts at Amherst
 Oglesby Songs – Website devoted to the music of Carl Oglesby, including arrangements of several of his songs.
 Johanna Vogelsang. "I told you things were crumbling." (c.1975) at Center for the Study of Political Graphics

1935 births
2011 deaths
20th-century American male writers
20th-century American non-fiction writers
21st-century American male writers
21st-century American non-fiction writers
American anti–Vietnam War activists
American conspiracy theorists
American democracy activists
American libertarians
American male non-fiction writers
American political writers
American tax resisters
Bendix Corporation people
COINTELPRO targets
Dartmouth College faculty
Deaths from cancer in New Jersey
Deaths from lung cancer
Kent State University alumni
Massachusetts Institute of Technology faculty
Members of Students for a Democratic Society
Non-interventionism
Place of birth missing
Researchers of the assassination of John F. Kennedy
University of Michigan alumni
Writers from Akron, Ohio